Knops Pond is a lake in Middlesex County, in the U.S. state of Massachusetts.

Knops Pond was named after James Knapp (or Knop), a pioneer citizen.

See also
Lost Lake (Groton)

References

Lakes of Middlesex County, Massachusetts